Drinkwater is a Canadian coming-of-age comedy film, directed by Stephen Campanelli and released in 2021. The film stars Daniel Doheny as Mike Drinkwater, a teenager living in Penticton, British Columbia, with his father Hank (Eric McCormack); an outsider because his father does not hold down a steady job and instead lives solely off the proceeds of insurance fraud schemes, Mike finds his life transformed when he befriends Wallace (Louriza Tronco), a young woman who moves into the house next door.

The film's cast also includes Jordan Burtchett, Alex Zahara, Linda Darlow, Bob Frazer, Naika Toussaint, Chloe Babcook, Vincent Cheng, Jana Benoit, Lisa Huynh, Mavourneen Varcoe-Ryan, Beth Fotheringham, David Allan Pearson, Matt Shay, Quinn Hubscher, and Graham Fraser.

The film premiered at the 2021 Calgary International Film Festival, where it won the Audience Choice Award for Best Canadian Narrative Film. It was subsequently screened at the 2021 Whistler Film Festival, where it won the Audience Award.

Doheny won the Vancouver Film Critics Circle award for Best Actor in a Canadian Film at the Vancouver Film Critics Circle Awards 2021, and McCormack was nominated for Best Supporting Actor in a Canadian Film.

References

External links

2021 films
2021 comedy films
Canadian coming-of-age comedy films
English-language Canadian films
Films shot in British Columbia
Films set in British Columbia
Films directed by Stephen Campanelli
2020s English-language films
2020s Canadian films